Sugley is an area of Newcastle upon Tyne adjacent to Lemington in North East England: its parish church is Holy Saviour, Sugley.

References 

Districts of Newcastle upon Tyne